The Crab with the Golden Claws is a 1947 Belgian stop motion feature film produced by Wilfried Bouchery for Films Claude Misonne and based on the comic book of the same name from The Adventures of Tintin by Hergé. This was the first Tintin story to be adapted into a movie and follows the story of the comic almost exactly.

There were only two theatrical screenings of the film; the first at the ABC Cinema on 11 January 1947 for a group of special invited guests, while the other one was shown in public on 21 December of that year, before Bouchery declared bankruptcy and fled to Argentina. All of the equipment was seized and a copy of the film is currently stored at Belgium's Cinémathèque Royale. The copy is available to watch for paying members of the Tintin club.

Plot 

Tintin finds himself involved in a mystery of a drowned man, a regular tin of crab meat, and the name of a ship called the Karaboudjan scribbled on a piece of paper inside of the man's pockets. Upon investigating the ship, Tintin discovers that the shipment of tin cans contains not crab meat, but drugs. After learning about the ship's shady business, Tintin ends up becoming prisoner on the ship which already cast off from the port. The only way for Tintin to escape is by heading for dry land by lifeboat, and the only person to aid him is the ship's whisky guzzling Captain named Haddock who is the only one on board not aware that his crew is trafficking drugs right under his nose.

Release in DVD 
On 14 May 2008, the film was released on PAL DVD in France by Fox Pathe Europa.

See also 
List of animated feature-length films
List of stop-motion films

References 
 Battrick, Oliver. (21 March 2004). "The Crab With the Golden Claws (1947) - the first Tintin movie". Tintinologist.org.

External links 
 

Tintin films
1947 animated films
1947 films
1940s stop-motion animated films
Belgian animated films
Belgian children's films
Films based on Belgian comics
Animated films based on comics
Films set in Morocco
Films set in deserts
Belgian black-and-white films
1940s French-language films